96.4 Spice FM is a Bangladeshi FM radio station, the headquarter of which radio station is situated in Dhaka. It has started broadcasting on 1 September 2016. It is privately run by Radio Masala Limited and developed by the present CEO Tasnim Borsha Islam, who had always been a fan of radio and dance music.

Radio jockeys 
Radio jockeys include: 
 RJ Tazz 
 Rj Raju 
 Rj Anik
 Rj Srabon
 RJ Aniza
 RJ Mim
 Rj Suchona
 Rj Rima
 RJ Heaven
 RJ Shafin
 RJ Ony
 Rj Amy
 RJ SHATHI
 RJ SHOAIB
 RJ MOCHA
 RJ NISHITA
 RJ JUTHIKA
 RJ FAHAD

PROGRAM MANAGER 
 KABBO SHARIAR

HEAD OF SOUND 
 JAJABOR RASEL

TECHNICAL INCHARGE  
 TANBIR HOSSAIN

Programs schedule
Spice FM shows include:

Regular shows
 Jumps Start
 Torker Raat
 The D Show
 Breaking Music Show
 The After hours show

Weekly shows 
 Gangsta time with Tazz
 ANONDO NIBASH 
 SHOPNODHORA
 REPORTERS FILE
 ROHOSSHO
 CHUTIR SHOKAL
 CAREER A TO Z
 SPICE GAAN LOUNGE 
 Health Talk
 Spice Sunday Night 
 Travellers Diary
 Shottanneshi
 Bhoot Night
 Islami Sawal Jawab

As part of socio-economic responsibility spice FM doing different welfare programs.

References

External links
 
 
 Spice FM on Youtube
 
 
App Dynamic Link

2016 establishments in Bangladesh
Organisations based in Dhaka
Radio stations in Bangladesh
Mass media in Dhaka